Axel Cruysberghs (born October 12, 1994) is a Belgian professional street skateboarder.

In 2015, Cruysberghs made his debut at the X Games in Austin, Texas. He made his first appearance at the X Games in Minneapolis, Minnesota, in 2018. Cruysberghs represented Belgium in the rescheduled 2020 Summer Olympics, in Tokyo, Japan. He finished 13th in the semifinal round in Tokyo for street skating and did not make the finals.

In October 2020, Cruysberghs married Finnish-American professional skateboarder Lizzie Armanto. He resides in Oceanside, California.

References

External links
 
 
 
 X Games bio
 Dew Tour bio
 2020 Tokyo Olympics bio

1994 births
Living people
Belgian skateboarders
Olympic skateboarders of Belgium
People from Poperinge
Skateboarders at the 2020 Summer Olympics
Sportspeople from West Flanders
21st-century Belgian people